Henry Thorn (6 November 1840 – 19 April 1880) was a politician in Queensland, Australia. He was a Member of the Queensland Legislative Assembly.

Early life
Henry Thorn was born on 6 November 1840 in Ipswich, Queensland, the son of George Thorn (senior), a Member of the Queensland Legislative Assembly, and his wife Jane (née Handcock).

Politics
At the 1867 colonial election, Thorn was elected to the Queensland Legislative Assembly in the electoral district of Northern Downs. He held that seat until following election 16 months later where he was defeated by Joshua Peter Bell.

At the 1873 election, he won back the seat of Northern Downs, which he held until he resigned on 30 October 1876. William Miles won the resulting by-election on 14 November 1876.

Later life
Thorn died on 19 April 1880 at Ipswich and was buried in the Anglican section of Ipswich General Cemetery.

See also
 Members of the Queensland Legislative Assembly, 1867–1868
 Members of the Queensland Legislative Assembly, 1873–1878

References

Members of the Queensland Legislative Assembly
1840 births
1880 deaths
Burials at Ipswich General Cemetery
19th-century Australian politicians